WDNE is a Country formatted broadcast radio station licensed to Elkins, West Virginia, serving Elkins and Randolph County in West Virginia.  WDNE is owned and operated by West Virginia Radio Corporation.

References

External links
 98-9 WDNE Online

1948 establishments in West Virginia
DNE (AM)
Radio stations established in 1948
DNE